The Rockaway Avenue station is a station on the IRT New Lots Line of the New York City Subway, located at Rockaway Avenue and Livonia Avenue in Brownsville, Brooklyn. It is served by the 3 train at all times except late nights, when the 4 train takes over service. During rush hours, occasional 2, 4 and 5 trains also stop here.

History 

The New Lots Line was built as a part of Contract 3 of the Dual Contracts between New York City and the Interborough Rapid Transit Company, including this station. It was built as an elevated line because the ground in this area is right above the water table, and as a result the construction of a subway would have been prohibitively expensive. The first portion of the line between Utica Avenue and Junius Street, including this station, opened on November 22, 1920, with shuttle trains operating over this route. The line was completed to New Lots Avenue on October 16, 1922, with a two-car train running on the northbound track. On October 31, 1924, through service to New Lots Avenue was begun.

From April 20, 2015 to March 28, 2016, Rockaway Avenue and Van Siclen Avenue were closed for renovations.

Station layout

This station has two side platforms and two tracks. Between the two tracks, there is space for an additional third track that was never installed.

Exits
This station's only exit is via a wooden mezzanine under the tracks. The mezzanine has a crossunder and metal canopies. Outside fare control, stairs go to the northwest and southeast corners of Livonia and Rockaway Avenues.

References

External links 
 
 

IRT New Lots Line stations
Brownsville, Brooklyn
New York City Subway stations in Brooklyn
Railway stations in the United States opened in 1920
1920 establishments in New York City